Philotheca ericifolia is a species of flowering plant in the family Rutaceae and is endemic to New South Wales. It is a much-branched shrub with glandular-warty branchlets, needle-shaped leaves and white to pink flowers arranged singly or in groups of up to six on the ends of the branchlets.

Description
The ten stamens are densely hairy.

Taxonomy and naming
This species was first formally described in 1863 by George Bentham from an unpublished description by Allan Cunningham who gave it the name Eriostemon ericifolius. Bentham published the description in Flora Australiensis. Cunningham collected the type specimens in "on the skirts of the Liverpool Plains" in 1825.

In 1998, Wilson changed the name to Philotheca ericifolia in the journal Nuytsia.

Distribution and habitat
Philotheca ericifolia grows in heath and forest, mainly in damp sandy flats and gullies. It is found in the upper Hunter Valley and in the northern Pilliga scrub.

Conservation status
This philotheca was previously classified as "vulnerable" under the Australian Government Environment Protection and Biodiversity Conservation Act 1999 and the New South Wales Government Threatened Species Conservation Act but has been delisted from both.

References

ericifolia
Flora of New South Wales
Sapindales of Australia
Plants described in 1863
Taxa named by Allan Cunningham (botanist)